This is a non-exhaustive list of Kenya women's international footballers – association football players who have appeared at least once for the senior Kenya women's national football team.

Players

See also 
 Kenya women's national football team

References

 
Kenya
Association football player non-biographical articles